is Japan's largest trading company (sogo shosha) and a member of the Mitsubishi keiretsu. As of 2022, Mitsubishi Corporation employs over 80,000 people and has ten business segments, including finance, banking, energy, machinery, chemicals, and food.

History
The company traces its roots to the Mitsubishi conglomerate founded by Yataro Iwasaki. Iwasaki was originally employed by the Tosa clan of modern-day Kōchi Prefecture, who posted him to Nagasaki in the 1860s. During this time, Iwasaki became close to Sakamoto Ryōma, a major figure in the Meiji Restoration that ended the Tokugawa shogunate and restored the primacy of the emperor of Japan in 1867. Iwasaki was placed in charge of the Tosa clan's trading operation, Tsukumo Shokai, based in Osaka. This company changed its name in the following years to Mitsukawa Shokai and then to Mitsubishi Shokai. Around 1871, the company was renamed Mitsubishi Steamship Company and began a mail service between Yokohama and Shanghai with government sponsorship.

Under Iwasaki's leadership in the late 1800s, Mitsubishi diversified its business into insurance (Tokio Marine Insurance Company and Meiji Life Insurance Company), mining (Takashima Coal Mine) and shipbuilding. Following his death in 1885, his successor Yanosuke Iwasaki merged the shipping operation with a rival enterprise to form the Nippon Yusen Kaisha (NYK) and refocused Mitsubishi's business on coal and copper mining. In 1918, the group's international trading business was spun off to form Mitsubishi Shoji Kaisha. Mitsubishi Goshi Kaisha served as the parent company of the group through World War II, during which group company Mitsubishi Heavy Industries (launched in 1934) produced ships, aircraft and heavy machinery for the war effort.

After the war, the administration of Douglas MacArthur called for the dissolution of the "zaibatsu" corporations that dominated the Japanese economy. Mitsubishi was the only major zaibatsu to initially refuse this request, at the orders of the president Koyata Iwasaki, who shortly thereafter fell seriously ill. Mitsubishi eventually dissolved in 1947, and under restrictive rules imposed by the occupation authorities, the employees of the Mitsubishi Shoji trading arm rebranded into 100 separate companies. Beginning in 1950, the restrictions on re-consolidation of the zaibatsu were eased, and by 1952 most of the former Mitsubishi Shoji had coalesced into three companies.

The current Mitsubishi Corporation was founded by the merger of these three companies to form Mitsubishi Shoji Kaisha, Ltd. in 1954; Mitsubishi listed on the Tokyo Stock Exchange and Osaka Stock Exchange in the same year. It changed its name to "Mitsubishi Corporation" in 1971. Concurrently with its relaunch, Mitsubishi opened fourteen liaison offices outside Japan, as well as a US subsidiary called Mitsubishi International Corporation with offices in New York and San Francisco. By 1960, Mitsubishi had fifty-one overseas offices. Mitsubishi's first large-scale investment outside Japan was a liquefied natural gas project in Brunei, committed to in 1968.

Along with Mitsubishi Bank, Mitsubishi Corporation played a central role in international trading for other constituents of the former Mitsubishi zaibatsu during the postwar era, such as Mitsubishi Heavy Industries and the Mitsubishi Motor Company, forming a major keiretsu business group centered around the Second Friday Conference (Kinyo-kai) of company managers.

Mitsubishi was the largest Japanese general trading company from the late 1960s until the mid-1980s; after falling to fifth place in 1986, it embarked on a series of large overseas acquisitions together with other companies in the Mitsubishi group. By 2015 Mitsubishi was again the top-ranked general trading company by net earnings. However, Mitsubishi saw its first postwar net loss in the fiscal year ended March 2016, amid a slowdown in the Chinese economy and a slump in the commodity markets, causing Mitsubishi to lose its #1 position to Itochu.

Berkshire Hathaway acquired over 5% of the stock in the company, along with four other Japanese trading houses, over the 12-month period ending in August 2020.

Business segments 
Mitsubishi Corporation businesses are divided into eight business sections:
Business Service Group: Focuses on information technology. Mitsubishi is the Japanese partner of Tata Consultancy Services and operates a data center in Mitaka, Tokyo.
Global Environmental & Infrastructure Business Group: Handles transportation, water, electricity, and industrial projects. Its infrastructure projects include airports in Mandalay and Ulaanbataar, urban railways in Cairo, Doha and Dubai, and power projects under the Diamond Generating and Diamond Transmission names. In 2015, Mitsubishi announced a strategic alliance with Turkey's Çalık Enerji to boost its infrastructure business in Turkey and Northern Africa.
Industrial Finance, Logistics and Development Group: Engages in asset management, asset financing, real estate and logistics.
Energy Business Group: Handles trading and investment in crude oil, liquefied natural gas, liquefied petroleum gas, shale gas, biofuel, and other energy commodities in various countries.
Metals Group: Develops concessions and trades in coal, iron ore, nickel, chrome, copper, aluminum, uranium and platinum. In 2014, Mitsubishi opened a $3.4 billion coking coal mine in Caval Ridge, Queensland, Australia, through its 50% shareholding in the BHP Mitsubishi Alliance.
Machinery Group: Sells heavy machinery, ships, defense equipment, and motor vehicles (particularly for Isuzu).
Chemicals Group: Manufactures and trades in a wide variety of commodity and functional chemicals, especially petrochemicals.
Living Essentials Group: Develops and trades in consumer products and manages retailing operations; investor in Lawson and Alfamart.

Of these segments, energy is the largest by far, accounting for almost half of the company's consolidated net income in the first half of the fiscal year 2015.

Awards
In 2008 Mitsubishi Corporation was crowned In-House of the Year - Trading Company In-House Team of the Year at the 2008 ALB Japan Law Awards.

Environmental record

In March 1998 the Mitsubishi Corporation received the quarterly Greenwash Award. It was awarded to Mitsubishi Corporation for successful efforts at portraying its business operations as environmentally friendly. It was argued that through the use of public relations the corporation demonstrated to the world that Exportadora de Sal S.A., their subsidiaries facility off the coast of Mexico, was environmentally benign. The facility is a salt evaporation factory and is in a lagoon that also holds a gray whale calving ground. 

As of 2009, Mitsubishi held between 35% to 40% of the worldwide market for bluefin tuna.

Mitsubishi was also the subject of a boycott by the Rainforest Action Network for its role in the destruction of rainforests through its forestry activities. In November, 2019, Mitsubishi Corporation stated that it will buy Eneco, a company that focuses on renewable energy, in a deal valuing the Dutch energy firm at $4.52 billion.

References

External links
 

Mitsubishi companies
Trading companies based in Tokyo
Conglomerate companies based in Tokyo
Conglomerate companies established in 1954
Companies listed on the Tokyo Stock Exchange
Companies listed on the Osaka Exchange
Companies listed on the London Stock Exchange
Japanese companies established in 1954